The following is a list of awards and nominations received by actress Vanessa Redgrave. She has won several Major acting awards, including one Academy Award, one BAFTA TV Award, two Emmy Awards, one Olivier Award, and one Tony Award. Other significant wins include two Golden Globe Awards, a Screen Actors Guild Award, and two Drama Desk Awards. She received the lifetime achievement BAFTA Fellowship in 2010. Redgrave is one of the few actresses to have won the Triple Crown of Acting, which is competitive Academy Award, Emmy Award, and Tony Award wins. She was the first actress to win all four Broadway and West End stage acting awards. Overall, in her career to date, she has won 42 awards from 97 nominations. In 1999, she was offered the title of Dame Commander of the Order of the British Empire, but she declined it before accepting it in 2022.

In 2018, she received the Golden Lion for Lifetime Achievement at the 75th Venice International Film Festival.

Film and television awards

Academy Awards

BAFTA Awards

Cannes Film Festival

Critics' Choice Movie Awards

Golden Globe Awards

Primetime Emmy Awards

Screen Actors Guild Awards

Venice Film Festival

Miscellaneous award wins and nominations

Theatre awards

Drama Desk Awards

Evening Standard Awards

Olivier Awards

Tony Awards

Honorary awards

Notes

References

External links

See also
Vanessa Redgrave filmography

Redgrave. Vanessa